Abilov is a surname. Notable people with the surname include:

Atakhan Abilov (born 1965), Azerbaijani lawyer and activist
Bulat Abilov (born 1957), Kazakhstani politician
Fetislyam (Anatoly) Abilov (1915–2005), World War II commander
Ismail Abilov (born 1951), Bulgarian sport wrestler